was the father of the famed Imagawa Ujichika and the 9th head of the Imagawa clan. 

Yoshitada spent most of his time invading Tōtōmi Province, attacking the Katsumada and Yokota clans. However, after Yoshitada thought he had destroyed the clans of Katsumada and Yokota, and he was returning to his home at Suruga, he was attacked and killed at Shiokaizaka by the remnants of the two clans he thought to have completely destroyed.  

After Yoshitada's death, he was succeeded by his eldest son Imagawa Ujichika. Even though at that time Ujichika was not of age, he soon carried on in his father's legacy. His childhood name was Tatsuomaru (龍王丸).

Family
 Father: Imagawa Noritada (1408-1461?)
 Mother: Uesugi Ujisada's daughter
 Wife: Lady Kitagawa
 Children:
 daughter married Ogimachi Sanjo Sanemichi by Lady Kitagawa
 Imagawa Ujichika by Lady Kitagawa

Daimyo
1436 births
1476 deaths
Imagawa clan